Tshediso Patjie (born 4 November 1990) is a South African soccer player who plays as a midfielder for South African Premier Division side Moroka Swallows.

References

1990 births
Living people
South African soccer players
Association football midfielders
Mbombela United F.C. players
Baroka F.C. players
Sekhukhune United F.C. players
Moroka Swallows F.C. players
South African Premier Division players
National First Division players